The 2014–15 Marist Red Foxes men's basketball team represented Marist College during the 2014–15 NCAA Division I men's basketball season. The Red Foxes, led by first year head coach Mike Maker, played their home games at the McCann Arena and were members of the Metro Atlantic Athletic Conference. They finished the season 7–25, 5–15 in MAAC play to finish in a tie for tenth place. They advanced to the quarterfinals of the MAAC tournament where they lost to Manhattan.

Previous season 

The Red Foxes finished the 2013–14 season 12–19, 9–11 in MAAC play to finish in a three way tie for sixth place. They lost in the first round of the MAAC tournament where they lost to Niagara. Following the season, head coach Jeff Bower resigned to take the General manager position with the Detroit Pistons. Mike Maker was hired as his successor.

Roster

Schedule

|-
!colspan=9 style=";"| Regular season

|-
!colspan=9 style=";"| MAAC tournament

References

Marist Red Foxes men's basketball seasons
Marist
Marist Red Foxes men's basketball
Marist Red Foxes men's basketball